David Nathan (born 12 October 1965) is an Australian fencer. He competed in the individual épée event at the 2000 Summer Olympics.

References

External links
 

1965 births
Living people
Australian male fencers
Olympic fencers of Australia
Fencers at the 2000 Summer Olympics
People from Portland, Victoria
Sportsmen from Victoria (Australia)